The 1981 Arizona State Sun Devils baseball team represented Arizona State University in the 1981 NCAA Division I baseball season. The Sun Devils played their home games at Packard Stadium. The team was coached by Jim Brock in his 10th season at Arizona State.

The Sun Devils won the College World Series, defeating the Oklahoma State Cowboys in the championship game.

Roster

Schedule 

! style="background:#FFB310;color:#990033;"| Regular Season
|- valign="top" 

|- align="center" bgcolor="#ddffdd"
| February 2 ||  || Packard Stadium || 6–4 || 1–0 || –
|- align="center" bgcolor="#ddffdd"
| February 3 || Long Beach State || Packard Stadium || 15–9 || 2–0 || –
|- align="center" bgcolor="#ddffdd"
| February 4 || Long Beach State || Packard Stadium || 21–10 || 3–0 || –
|- align="center" bgcolor="#ffdddd"
| February 6 || at  || Titan Field || 1–3 || 3–1 || –
|- align="center" bgcolor="#ffdddd"
| February 7 || at Cal State Fullerton || Titan Field || 5–7 || 3–2 || –
|- align="center" bgcolor="#ddffdd"
| February 11 ||  || Packard Stadium || 10–5 || 4–2 || –
|- align="center" bgcolor="#ddffdd"
| February 14 ||  || Packard Stadium || 12–10 || 5–2 || –
|- align="center" bgcolor="#ffdddd"
| February 15 || Wichita State || Packard Stadium || 9–10 || 5–3 || –
|- align="center" bgcolor="#ddffdd"
| February 16 || Wichita State || Packard Stadium || 11–2 || 6–3 || –
|- align="center" bgcolor="#ddffdd"
| February 18 ||  || Packard Stadium || 17–10 || 7–3 || –
|- align="center" bgcolor="#ddffdd"
| February 19 || Azusa Pacific || Packard Stadium || 9–0 || 8–3 || –
|- align="center" bgcolor="#ddffdd"
| February 20 ||  || Packard Stadium || 16–13 || 9–3 || –
|- align="center" bgcolor="#ddffdd"
| February 21 || New Mexico || Packard Stadium || 19–15 || 10–3 || –
|- align="center" bgcolor="#ddffdd"
| February 22 || New Mexico || Packard Stadium || 10–2 || 11–3 || –
|- align="center" bgcolor="#ddffdd"
| February 23 ||  || Packard Stadium || 14–4 || 12–3 || –
|- align="center" bgcolor="#ddffdd"
| February 25 || La Verne || Packard Stadium || 12–4 || 13–3 || –
|- align="center" bgcolor="#ddffdd"
| February 27 ||  || Packard Stadium || 4–3 || 14–3 || –
|- align="center" bgcolor="#ddffdd"
| February 28 || UNLV || Packard Stadium || 8–3 || 15–3 || –
|-

|- align="center" bgcolor="#ddffdd"
| March 1 || UNLV || Packard Stadium || 7–5 || 16–3 || –
|- align="center" bgcolor="#ddffdd"
| March 3 ||  || Packard Stadium || 17–2 || 17–3 || –
|- align="center" bgcolor="#ffdddd"
| March 3 || BYU || Packard Stadium || 4–5 || 17–4 || –
|- align="center" bgcolor="#ddffdd"
| March 6 || at  || Jackie Robinson Stadium || 13–9 || 18–4 || 1–0
|- align="center" bgcolor="#ddffdd"
| March 7 || at UCLA || Jackie Robinson Stadium || 10–1 || 19–4 || 2–0
|- align="center" bgcolor="#ddffdd"
| March 8 || at UCLA || Jackie Robinson Stadium || 15–5 || 20–4 || 3–0
|- align="center" bgcolor="#ffdddd"
| March 10 || at  || Pete Beiden Field || 5–7 || 20–5 || –
|- align="center" bgcolor="#ffdddd"
| March 11 || at  || Buck Shaw Stadium || 0–2 || 20–6 || –
|- align="center" bgcolor="#ddffdd"
| March 14 || at  || Evans Diamond || 8–6 || 21–6 || 4–0
|- align="center" bgcolor="#ddffdd"
| March 14 || at California || Evans Diamond || 10–6 || 22–6 || 5–0
|- align="center" bgcolor="#ddffdd"
| March 18 ||  || Packard Stadium || 21–0 || 23–6 || –
|- align="center" bgcolor="#ddffdd"
| March 20 ||  || Packard Stadium || 7–4 || 24–6 || 6–0
|- align="center" bgcolor="#ddffdd"
| March 21 || Southern California || Packard Stadium || 20–12 || 25–6 || 7–0
|- align="center" bgcolor="#ddffdd"
| March 22 || Southern California || Packard Stadium || 10–6 || 26–6 || 8–0
|- align="center" bgcolor="#ffdddd"
| March 24 ||  || Packard Stadium || 3–5 || 26–7 || –
|- align="center" bgcolor="#ddffdd"
| March 27 ||  || Packard Stadium || 9–2 || 27–7 || 9–0
|- align="center" bgcolor="#ddffdd"
| March 28 || Stanford || Packard Stadium || 12–7 || 28–7 || 10–0
|- align="center" bgcolor="#ddffdd"
| March 29 || Stanford || Packard Stadium || 9–6 || 29–7 || 11–0
|- align="center" bgcolor="#ddffdd"
| March 31 ||  || Packard Stadium || 17–7 || 30–7 || –
|-

|- align="center" bgcolor="#ffdddd"
| April 2 || at  || Sancet Stadium || 4–9 || 30–8 || 11–1
|- align="center" bgcolor="#ddffdd"
| April 3 || at Arizona || Sancet Stadium || 10–8 || 31–8 || 12–1
|- align="center" bgcolor="#ddffdd"
| April 4 || at Arizona || Sancet Stadium || 23–11 || 32–8 || 13–1
|- align="center" bgcolor="#ddffdd"
| April 7 || Grand Canyon || Packard Stadium || 14–9 || 33–8 || –
|- align="center" bgcolor="#ddffdd"
| April 9 || California || Packard Stadium || 8–7 || 34–8 || 14–1
|- align="center" bgcolor="#ddffdd"
| April 10 || California || Packard Stadium || 19–5 || 35–8 || 15–1
|- align="center" bgcolor="#ddffdd"
| April 11 || California || Packard Stadium || 6–4 || 36–8 || 16–1
|- align="center" bgcolor="#ddffdd"
| April 12 || California || Packard Stadium || 8–4 || 37–8 || 17–1
|- align="center" bgcolor="#ffdddd"
| April 14 ||  || Packard Stadium || 4–5 || 37–9 || –
|- align="center" bgcolor="#ddffdd"
| April 16 || at Southern California || Dedeaux Field || 6–0 || 38–9 || 18–1
|- align="center" bgcolor="#ddffdd"
| April 17 || at Southern California || Dedeaux Field || 13–3 || 39–9 || 19–1
|- align="center" bgcolor="#ddffdd"
| April 18 || at Southern California || Dedeaux Field || 13–2 || 40–9 || 20–1
|- align="center" bgcolor="#ddffdd"
| April 21 || at Northern Arizona ||  || 7–4 || 41–9 || –
|- align="center" bgcolor="#ddffdd"
| April 24 || UCLA || Packard Stadium || 6–5 || 42–9 || 21–1
|- align="center" bgcolor="#ddffdd"
| April 25 || UCLA || Packard Stadium || 10–9 || 43–9 || 22–1
|- align="center" bgcolor="#ddffdd"
| April 26 || UCLA || Packard Stadium || 14–9 || 44–9 || 23–1
|-

|- align="center" bgcolor="#ffdddd"
| May 1 || at Stanford || Sunken Diamond || 3–18 || 44–10 || 23–2
|- align="center" bgcolor="#ffdddd"
| May 2 || at Stanford || Sunken Diamond || 4–9 || 44–11 || 23–3
|- align="center" bgcolor="#ffdddd"
| May 3 || at Stanford || Sunken Diamond || 4–16 || 44–12 || 23–4
|- align="center" bgcolor="#ddffdd"
| May 7 || Arizona || Packard Stadium || 10–6 || 45–12 || 24–4
|- align="center" bgcolor="#ddffdd"
| May 8 || Arizona || Packard Stadium || 13–4 || 46–12 || 25–4
|- align="center" bgcolor="#ddffdd"
| May 9 || Arizona || Packard Stadium || 6–5 || 47–12 || 26–4
|-

|-
! style="background:#990033;color:white;"| Post-Season
|-

|- align="center" bgcolor="ddffdd"
| May 22 || vs.  || Packard Stadium || 9–6 || 48–12
|- align="center" bgcolor="ddffdd"
| May 23 || vs. Cal State Fullerton || Packard Stadium || 18–9 || 49–12
|- align="center" bgcolor="ddffdd"
| May 24 || vs. Cal State Fullerton || Packard Stadium || 12–7 || 50–12
|-

|- align="center" bgcolor="ddffdd"
| May 30 || vs. Texas || Rosenblatt Stadium || 11–2 || 51–12
|- align="center" bgcolor="ddffdd"
| June 2 || vs.  || Rosenblatt Stadium || 4–3 || 52–12
|- align="center" bgcolor="ffdddd"
| June 5 || vs. Oklahoma State || Rosenblatt Stadium || 10–11 || 52–13
|- align="center" bgcolor="ddffdd"
| June 6 || vs.  || Rosenblatt Stadium || 10–7 || 53–13
|- align="center" bgcolor="ddffdd"
| June 7 || vs. Texas || Rosenblatt Stadium || 12–3 || 54–13
|- align="center" bgcolor="ddffdd"
| June 8 || vs. Oklahoma State || Rosenblatt Stadium || 7–4 || 55–13
|-

Awards and honors 
Kendall Carter
 First Team All-American
 First Team All-Pac-10

Alvin Davis
 College World Series All-Tournament Team
 First Team All-Pac-10

Kevin Dukes
 College World Series All-Tournament Team
 First Team All-Pac-10

Stan Holmes
 College World Series Most Outstanding Player

Lemmie Miller
 College World Series All-Tournament Team

Ricky Nelson
 First Team All-Pac-10

Kevin Romine
 First Team All-American
 First Team All-Pac-10

Mike Sodders
 College World Series All-Tournament Team
 Baseball America Player of the Year
 First Team All-American
 First Team All-Pac-10
 Pac-10 Player of the Year

Sun Devils in the 1981 MLB Draft 
The following members of the Arizona State Sun Devils baseball program were drafted in the 1981 Major League Baseball Draft.

References 

Arizona State
Arizona State Sun Devils baseball seasons
College World Series seasons
NCAA Division I Baseball Championship seasons
Pac-12 Conference baseball champion seasons
1981 in sports in Arizona